Old German herding dogs (German: altdeutsche Hütehunde), including old German sheep dogs or old German shepherd dogs (altdeutsche Schäferhunde) are a group of traditional types of working, herding dogs from Germany.  They are landraces consisting of working strains of dog, and some of them are the types from which the modern German Shepherd Dog was developed as a standardised breed.  The landraces are not recognised by the Fédération Cynologique Internationale, but some have their own standards which are for working ability, not appearance traits.

History 
Before the 1890s, any dog used for herding and protecting sheep in Germany was referred to as a "German shepherd dog". The dogs were bred solely for their working ability, with little effort to standardise a particular appearance or create a defined breed of dog.

In 1899, a new formal breed was established by the Society for the German Shepherd Dog.  This was selected from among the working shepherd dogs, and became the modern German Shepherd Dog breed.

Many German herdsmen continued to breed their dogs for working ability rather than to the new breed standard, and their remaining non-standardised working dogs were called  (plural with ), literally 'old-German shepherd-dog'.

Under the Verein für Deutsche Schäferhunde (Society for the German Shepherd Dog), the long-haired variant of the German Shepherd Dog for a long time was not accepted. This changed in 2009. Since 2010, the long-haired type has been accepted. Other old landraces herding dogs, used for cattle rather than sheep, and which are not ancestors of the modern German Shepherd (including ""-coated dogs,, cow-dogs), were also encompassed within the generic category .

Appearance 

Today's old German herding dogs differ scarcely from the landraces of the 19th and the early 20th century. Their breed standards (when they exist) require that the animal has to be capable of herding sheep and cattle but seldom prescribe physical appearance, though it is forbidden by these registries to cross-breed them with dogs of other breeds.  It is unclear to what extent these standardisation efforts are having an effect. In 2008, the German Society for the Conservation of Old and Endangered Livestock Breeds (GEH) listed these varieties as "extremely vulnerable" to extinction.

The named landraces for which breed standards have been created are divided into sub-groups, first after the livestock they herd, in cow dogs and sheep dogs; second by region (into south-German, or east- and central-German), and more finely by coat type and other features. Most of these have no name in English; approximate translations are shown (note that German capitalises all nouns, but no adjectives, even when derived from proper nouns):

Kuhhunde, 'cow-dogs'
Westerwälder (referring to the Westerwald mountains)
Siegerländer (referring to the Siegerland region)
Schafhunde, 'sheep-dogs'
süddeutscher Typ, 'south-German type'
süddeutsche Gelbbacke, 'south-German yellow-cheek' – black and tan
süddeutscher Schwarzer, 'south-German black'
Tiger, 'tiger[-patterned]' – merle-colored coat; common in south Germany, rarer elsewhere
ost-  mitteldeutscher Typ, 'east- or central-German type'
ost- bzw. mitteldeutsche Gelbbacke, 'east- or central-German yellow-cheek'
ost- bzw. mitteldeutscher Schwarzer, 'east- or central-German black'
ost- bzw. mitteldeutscher Fuchs, 'east- or central-German fox[-coloured]' – reddish)
harzer Fuchs, 'Harz fox' – reddish sheep-dogs from the Harz)
zotthaariger Typ [scraggy type] – long and raw-coated dogs similar to the Old English Sheepdog or Briard breeds
Strobel [lit. 'scrubby'] – a south-German type
Schafpudel, 'sheep-poodle' – a north- and central-German type

In the 19th century, there existed more of these landraces. Some of them became part of the modern German Shepherd Dog breed, while others became extinct in the course of time. They became extinct in the second half of the 20th century. The Pomeranian landrace was used to strengthen the Great Pyrenees, the Polish Tatra Sheepdog, the Kuvasz and similar now-standardised breeds. It is assumed that the last of the herding spitz landrace, which were mostly white and medium-sized, became part of the foundation stock of the White Shepherd breed. There may be other surviving landraces, not subject to any attempts to establish breed standards.

See also

 Dogs portal
 List of dog breeds
 Bohemian Shepherd dog
 Garafian Shepherd dog
 Galician Shepherd Dog

References

External links
 
 

Dog types
Dog breeds originating in Germany
German shepherds
History of the German Shepherd Dog
Animal breeds on the GEH Red List